Ly6/PLAUR domain-containing protein 1 is a protein that in humans is encoded by the LYPD1 gene.

This protein is also known as Lynx2, a member of the Lynx family of neurotransmitter receptor-binding proteins. Transgenic mice without Lynx2 expression have increased anxiety-related behaviors.

References

Further reading